George Emmett Nelson (February 26, 1905 – August 25, 1967) nicknamed "Ramrod", was a pitcher in Major League Baseball. He made 25 appearances, including eight starts, for the Cincinnati Reds during the 1935 and 1936 seasons.

References

External links

1905 births
1967 deaths
Major League Baseball pitchers
Cincinnati Reds players
Baseball players from South Dakota
People from Viborg, South Dakota